John Hind may refer to:

James Hind (sometimes referred to as John Hind, died 1652), 17th century highwayman
John Hind (mathematician) (1796–1866), English mathematician
John Russell Hind (1823–1895), English astronomer
John Hind (bishop of Fukien) (1879–1958), Anglican bishop in Fukien China
John Hind (bishop of Chichester) (born 1945), Anglican bishop and theologian in the UK
John Hind (swimmer),   Australian Paralympic swimmer

See also
John Hinde (disambiguation)